Mansuriyeh (also Romanized as Manşūrīyeh; also known as Mansūrābād) is a city in Howmeh Rural District, in the Central District of Behbahan County, Khuzestan Province, Iran. At the 2006 census, its population was 5,226, in 1,149 families.

References 

Populated places in Behbahan County
Cities in Khuzestan Province